This is a list of American football players who have played for the Akron Indians in the National Football League (NFL) and the Ohio League.  It includes players that played at least one match in the NFL regular season.  The Akron Indians franchise was founded around 1908 and lasted until 1926. The team folded in 1927. The club was known as the Akron Pros from 1920 until 1925.



A
Dunc Annan

B
Marty Beck,
George Berry,
Frank Bissell

C
Alvro Casey,
Knute Cauldwell,
Ralph Chase,
Earl Cramer,
Ken Crawford

D
Red Daum

G
Hal Griggs

H
Isham Hardy

L
Joe Little Twig

M
Nat McCombs,
Joe Mills

N
Al Nesser,
Ted Nesser,
Olin Newman

P
Peggy Parratt,
Fritz Pollard,
Mike Purdy

R
George Rohleder

S
Harry Seidelson

U
Rube Ursella

W
Ralph Waldsmith, 
Dutch Wallace,
Chang Welch,
Howe Welch,
Suey Welch,
Hal Wendler,
Sam Willaman

Z
Geff Zimmerman

Akron Pros
A